The ovarian cortex is the outer portion of the ovary. The ovarian follicles are located within the ovarian cortex. The ovarian cortex is made up of connective tissue.  Ovarian cortex tissue transplant has been performed to treat infertility.

References

External links 
 

Mammal female reproductive system